Asplundia domingensis is a species of plant in the Cyclanthaceae family. It is endemic to Ecuador.  Its natural habitat is subtropical or tropical moist lowland forests.

References

domingensis
Endemic flora of Ecuador
Endangered flora of South America
Taxonomy articles created by Polbot